Alona hercegovinae is a species of crustacean in the family Chydoridae. It is endemic to Bosnia and Herzegovina. Its natural habitat is inland karsts.

References

Cladocera
Freshwater crustaceans of Europe
Taxonomy articles created by Polbot
Crustaceans described in 1990